The Dōshi Club (lit. Fellow Thinkers Club) was a political party in Japan.

History
The party was established by Kijūrō Shidehara on 28 November 1947 as a breakaway from the Democratic Party. Its 22 MPs were opposed to the government's coal nationalisation law being pushed by Tetsu Katayama's government, which the DP was willing to make concessions over.

In March 1948 it merged with the Liberal Party and another faction from the Democratic Party to form the Democratic Liberal Party.

References

Defunct political parties in Japan
Political parties established in 1947
1947 establishments in Japan
Political parties disestablished in 1948
1948 disestablishments in Japan
Conservative parties in Japan
Defunct conservative parties